Tamari Miyashiro (born July 8, 1987) is an American indoor volleyball player (retired) and coach. As a libero, she was a two-time National Defensive Player of the Year at the University of Washington and played on the United States women's national volleyball team from 2010-2012. She won a silver medal at the 2012 Summer Olympics as a player and helped lead the national team to a gold medal at the 2020 Summer Olympics as an assistant coach.

Career

High school
Miyashiro played volleyball for four years at Kalani High School. She was a first team All-State selection as a junior and senior and led her team to three league titles. She was the 2004 Hawaii Gatorade Player of the Year.

College
Miyashiro played on the University of Washington volleyball team from 2006 to 2009. In her first year, she was named to the Pac-10 All-Freshman team. Her 637 digs was the second-highest single-season total in school history. In 2007, she had 622 digs, which was the third-highest mark in school history. She was a first team All-Pac-10 selection and was named the National Defensive Player of the Year by Asics/Volleyball Magazine. In 2008, Miyashiro had 5.14 digs per game to lead the Pac-10 in that category. She was again a first team All-Pac-10 selection and was named National Defensive Player of the Year by UnderArmour/Volleyball Magazine. She finished her college career in 2009 with University of Washington records for career digs (2,382) and digs per set (5.36).

International
Miyashiro joined the U.S. national team in January 2010. That year, she averaged 4.00 digs per set during the Tour of China, which led the team. She also played for SVS Post Schwechat.

In 2011, Miyashiro helped the Americans win the gold medal in the FIVB World Grand Prix. She started at libero in all five matches at the Pan American games, where the U.S. finished in third place.

At the 2012 FIVB World Grand Prix, Miyashiro was the team's starting libero in two matches and helped the U.S. win the gold medal. She then won the silver medal with the U.S. in the Olympics.

Personal
Miyashiro was born in Honolulu, Hawaii, and resides in Kaneohe, Hawaii. She graduated from the University of Washington in 2009.

Her mother played volleyball for the University of Hawaii.

Awards

College
 2007 Asics/Volleyball Magazine National Defensive Player of the Year
 2008 UnderArmour/Volleyball Magazine National Defensive Player of the Year
 Two-time AVCA All-American second team (2008, 2009)
 AVCA All-American third team (2007)
 All-Pacific Region first team (2007)
 Two-time All-Pac-10 first team (2007, 2008)
 Pac-10 All-Freshman team (2006)

References

External links
 

1987 births
Living people
Olympic silver medalists for the United States in volleyball
Volleyball players at the 2012 Summer Olympics
Volleyball players from Honolulu
American volleyball coaches
Washington Huskies women's volleyball players
Medalists at the 2012 Summer Olympics
Volleyball players at the 2011 Pan American Games
Pan American Games bronze medalists for the United States
American women's volleyball players
Pan American Games medalists in volleyball
Liberos
Expatriate volleyball players in Poland
Expatriate volleyball players in Azerbaijan
American expatriate sportspeople in Poland
American expatriate sportspeople in Azerbaijan
American sportspeople of Japanese descent
Medalists at the 2011 Pan American Games